Lomandra fluviatilis is a perennial, rhizomatous herb found in the Australian state of New South Wales.

References

fluviatilis
Asparagales of Australia
Flora of New South Wales